Kauktaung-ashe is a village in Hkamti Township in Hkamti District in the Sagaing Region of northwestern Burma.

References

External links
Maplandia World Gazetteer

Populated places in Hkamti District
Hkamti Township